Britt-Marie Elisabeth Göranzon Malmsjö (born 27 October 1942) is a Swedish actress. 

Marie Göranzon has been part of Sweden's Royal Dramatic Theatre-ensemble since 1967. She trained at the Royal Dramatic Training Academy from 1964 to 1967.

Personal life 
Göranzon's first husband was Lars Amble, an actor and director.
Göranzon's husband is Jan Malmsjö, an actor. Göranzon's son is Jonas Malmsjö, also an actor of Dramaten).

Filmography 
 1985 False as Water - Anna 
 2004 Day and Night - Modern.
Maragethe Chief of Police in Beck 2015-16

References

External links

1942 births
Living people
Swedish stage actresses
Eugene O'Neill Award winners
Litteris et Artibus recipients